The list of shipwrecks in 1957 includes ships sunk, foundered, grounded, or otherwise lost during 1957.

January

6 January

13 January

14 January

15 January

17 January

21 January

24 January

25 January

27 January

February

3 February

4 February

5 February

8 February

10 February

20 February

22 February

26 February

27 February

March

1 March

6 March

7 March

8 March

9 March

19 March

22 March

April

4 April

12 April

14 April

16 April

21 April

25 April

May

20 May

June

5 June

12 June

14 June

19 June

20 June

28 June

July

8 July

10 July

15 July

16 July

19 July

23 July

August

1 August

3 August

7 August

11 August

16 August

21 August

22 August

26 August

28 August

Unknown date

September

1 September

4 September

15 September

17 September

21 September

24 September

25 September

26 September

27 September

Unknown date

October

3 October

7 October

8 October

10 October

16 October

17 October

19 October

21 October

22 October

Unknown date

November

4 November

5 November

6 November

11 November

26 November

Unknown date

December

1 December

2 December

3 December

8 December

9 December

10 December

17 December

20 December

22 December

24 December

25 December

27 December

Unknown date

Unknown date

References

See also 

1957
 
Ships